The 2021–22 season is 1. FC Heidenheim's 15th season in existence and the club's 8th consecutive season in the 2. Bundesliga, the second tier of German football. The club will also participate in the DFB-Pokal.

Background and pre-season

1. FC Heidenheim finished the 2020–21 season in 8th place, 11 points below the automatic promotion places and 13 points below the promotion play-off place.

Friendly matches

Competitions

2. Bundesliga

League table

Matches

DFB-Pokal

Transfers

Transfers in

Loans in

Transfers out

Loans out

Notes

References

Heidenheim
1. FC Heidenheim seasons